Miru Kim is an artist, photographer, illustrator, and arts events coordinator, who has explored, documented, and photographed various urban settings such as abandoned subway stations, tunnels, the Croton aqueduct, Paris catacombs, factories, hospitals, and shipyards.

She is the daughter of Korean public philosopher Do-ol.

Early life and education
Kim is the daughter of contemporary South Korean philosopher Young-Oak Kim (aka Do-ol). She was born in Stoneham, Massachusetts in 1981 but was raised in Seoul, Korea. She returned to Massachusetts in 1995 to attend Phillips Academy in Andover, and later moved to New York City in 1999 to attend Columbia University. In 2006, she received an MFA in painting from Pratt Institute.

Career
Kim's Naked City Spleen series of photographs include images of herself nude in these settings. For the series The Pig That Therefore I Am, she visited industrial hog farms and immersed herself amongst the pigs.

She was included in Esquire'''s 2007 Best and Brightest issue. The Financial Times'' included Kim in an article titled "We'll climb that bridge when we get to it"  about urban explorers.

See also
 Ruins photography

References

External links
 
 TED Talks: Miru Kim's underground art of New York's urban ruins at TED in 2008

1981 births
American photographers
Artists from Massachusetts
American contemporary artists
American people of Korean descent
South Korean photographers
Living people
American women photographers
American women illustrators
American illustrators
South Korean women photographers
Columbia University alumni
Pratt Institute alumni
People from Stoneham, Massachusetts
Phillips Academy alumni
Gwangsan Kim clan
21st-century American women